Plush Lop is a breed of domestic rabbit with two varieties: Miniature and Standard. There is also a Canadian Plush Lop breed in development. Similar in appearance, the Velveteen Lop breed is also in development. Miniature Plush Lops were the first to be developed. Devie D'anniballe began creating this breed in 1995 in the United States. She succeeded in developing them by combining the previously existing breeds of Holland Lop, Mini Rex, and Mini Lop. Her aim was to create the perfect pet by retaining the good qualities of these breeds, while "breeding out" all the problems existing in these breeds.

Origins
By selecting for the best traits of each of these breeds, Devie created a breed of rabbit that had the compact, appealing body and lop ears of the Holland Lop and Mini Lop, combined with the soft, short, hypoallergenic fur of the Mini Rex. Since her aim was to create the perfect pet, personality was of great importance in Devie's breeding program. Miniature Plush Lops today have playful, friendly personalities, but they are also docile enough to allow their owners to hold them for reasonably long periods of time. While they are adventurous and outgoing, they are easy to catch, and quite affectionate.

Development
Standard Plush Lops were developed in Australia by Christine Toyer, starting in the early 1990s. Christine developed the Plush Lop by crossing Dwarf Lops with Standard Rex. This breed is best described by Christine Toyer herself, who said, "Combining the velvety short coats of the Rex Rabbit breed, with the loving personality and cute looks of the Lop Rabbit breeds, the Plush Lop is a breed with a lot to recommend it, both for pet owners and for the serious breeder."

In Australia and the UK, Plush Lops are still considered a breed in development, although it seems that soon Plush Lops will become a fully standardised breed according to the British Rabbit Council. Plush Lops may never become a standardised breed with the American Rabbit Breeders Association (ARBA), because one of ARBA's rules states that a new type of rabbit cannot be recognized as a "breed" if it only differs from an existing breed in coat quality. So if a Mini Plush Lop is nearly the same as a Holland Lop, excepting the rex coat, it is not "different" enough to be accepted by ARBA rules.

Canadian Plush Lop
There is also a Canadian Plush Lop, with the "curly" variant rex fur. Created using Astrex as well as Holland Lop and Mini Rex base stock, the Canadian Plush Lop is a curly breed. It has a more fully arched conformation than the other rex lops, is very bold and friendly, and excels at rabbit agility. The breed does not carry the dwarf gene and so tends to be four to six pounds in adult weight. Canadian Plush Lops were developed mainly in Alberta since the mid-1990s. The work was initiated by Dr. Helga Vierich and Brenda Wheeler, two Edmonton area breeders, and a Breeder's Group, formed in 2004, consisting of six rabbitries, carries on the work today. The Canadian Plush Lop (or CPLop as it is sometimes called) shares with the rare Astrex rabbit the tendency for the kits to be curly until the first juvenile moult, followed by a less curly "eclipse" coat. Then, at eight to eighteen months, the curls return with the first full adult moult. Canadian Plush Lops are the only fully arched lop breed and are one of only three curly-rex breeds in existence, but people who have come to know this breed tend to find their extremely people-oriented temperament their most remarkable feature.

Working Standard 
Working Standard for the Canadian Plush Lop [source: document approved by the Breeders' Group in 2008, updated 2011]

The Canadian Plush Lop
Working Standard

SCHEDULE OF POINTS
General type: 45
Head and ears: 10
Chest and shoulders: 5
Midsection 5
Hindquarters 10
Bone, legs, and feet 10
Tail 5
Fur: 40
Texture 15
Luster 5
Amount of curl 20
Color and Markings: 10
Condition: 5
Total Points: 100

To be entered and shown in two classifications:
Broken Pattern and Solid Pattern
Solid Pattern is either Self or Shaded.

SHOWROOM CLASSES AND WEIGHTS
Senior Bucks – 6 months of age and over, weight 3 ½   to 6 pounds. Ideal 4 1/2
Senior Does – 6 months of age and over, weight 3 ½ to 6 ½ pounds. Ideal 5
Junior Bucks and Does – Under 6 months of age, minimum weight 2 1/2 pounds.

Note: No animal may be shown in a higher or lower age classification than its true age. Juniors must be lopped, but do not have to show curl in the coat although preference will be given to a curly coated animal.

Canadian Plush Lops should be judged without handling, except for preliminary examination and coat evaluation.  General type is best viewed by stepping back from the judging table and allowing the rabbit to pose and move naturally.  A Canadian Plush Lop should not be pushed down or flattened out while judging. The animal should be friendly and bold in attitude, not shy or aggressive. They should have the look of an athletic, active individual.

GENERAL TYPE
Body – This is a full-arched breed, but not one taken to extremes. The body is to be of medium length, with width gradually increasing from the shoulders to the rump. Preference is given to an animal that will naturally sit upright on its haunches. In this position, there should be an arch and the body should be held off the ground. Ideally this animal should be handled little and allowed to run on the table to assess correctness of the bounding motion. Faults – extreme shortness of back so there is no arch; no increase in width from front to back.

Hindquarters – well muscled, rounded, and giving the appearance of springiness. Tail carried tightly to the rump. The hindquarters should be large and well muscled, and the body of the animal should be held well off the ground. Faults – screw tail, undercut, pinched hindquarters.

Midsection – should be broad enough to create taper from the hips to the shoulders. Faults – Rolls of fat. Cut severely for midsection wider than hindquarters.

Chest and Shoulders – Chest not too broad, forelimbs should emerge very straight and not be too far apart when the animal is sitting. Shoulders should be smooth and trim, but muscular enough to balance with the width of the midsection. Faults – overly wide, flabby, or too fat or fleshy shoulder. Pigeon chest.

Head and Ears – the whole appearance of the head and face of the animal should exemplify interest and alertness, as well as beauty and refinement. The crown should be situated on the very back of the top of the skull. This is further back than in most other lopped breeds. The ear should be about a finger width or more behind the position of the eye. Eyes large and preferably dark in all varieties but may be blue-gray in dilute Sable Points. Muzzle relatively small. The profile should be straight or even dished. The tips should be gently rounded. The ear should be as wide as possible ( minimum at the widest part).

There is no dewlap and the whole appearance of the head should be clean and free from fat and excess flesh. The head of the mature buck should be relatively wide and masculine, while the head of the doe is more refined and feminine, setting off the large eyes. In each sex the size of the head should be in balance with the rest of the animal and there should be no flattening of the face. Ears may show some mobility. Faults – overly large muzzle; eyes too small to balance the rest of the face; large dewlap; overly flat, round face (too short foreface, Holland Lop appearance).

Feet, Legs, Bone – the hind feet should appear wide and large, with good fur covering and strong nails and well defined ligaments. The forelimbs should be relatively long and slender and quite straight seen from the front. The foot should appear “on its toes” when the animal moves, but there should be a soft angulation at the wrist joint seen from the side, so that the animal does not jar its back when running. Bone should not appear heavy but rather strong and finely made. Faults – bowlegs in forelimbs; big or wide forefeet; forelimbs too short for the animal to sit up well; crooked or twisted legs; hind feet too narrow, too short to support the powerful hindquarters, or not parallel. Weak or twisted toenails.

Fur – soft and lustrous coat with as much wave and curl as possible, especially around the head and neck. Guard hairs should not be very noticeable except in junior and intermediate animals. Adult coat should be as thick and plush as possible without compromising the silky texture. You should be able to feel the curl, not just see it. The ideal coat should glow like a jewel. Appearance resembling satin preferred and satinized animals not to be faulted. Whiskers should be shortened, twisted and curled.

This is a curly haired breed, and the genetic factors responsible seem to increase their influence with each adult molt. Junior animals may exhibit a cottony soft or in some cases even a harsher texture, straighter, and occasionally with prominent guard hair, which all but disappears in the first adult molt around one year of age. Faults – in adults, guard hair prominent, protruding from coat to the extent that it interferes with the soft lustrous feel. Fur coarse and unyielding to touch. Complete absence of waves or curls, especially around head and neck.

COLORS

SOLID CLASS
Self Group: 
Black – The surface color is to be rich, jet black, extending well down the hair shaft. The undercolor is to be a dark slate blue. Toenails are to be dark. Eyes – Brown.
Blue – The surface color is to be a rich, dark blue, extending well down the hair shaft. The undercolor is to be a medium blue. Toenails are to be dark. Eyes – Brown or Blue-grey.
Chocolate – The surface color is to be rich chocolate, extending well down the hair shaft. The undercolor is to be a dove-grey. Toenails are to be dark. Eyes – Brown.
Lilac – The surface color is to be dove-grey with a pinkish tint, extending well down the airshaft.  The undercolor is to be a pale dove-grey. Toenails are to be dark. Eyes Brown or Blue-grey.
Self pattern is to have the same color over the entire animal. 
Self group faults: Fault animals for having faded color or scattered white hairs.
Self group disqualifications: Disqualify animals for having white toenails.

Shaded Group:
Black shading
Blue shading
Chocolate shading
Lilac shading
Seal – Color is to be a rich, dark sepia (almost black) saddle shading to a slightly paler flanks, chest, and belly. Color is to go well down the airshaft, with undercolor to match shadings throughout. Saddle color is to extend from the nape of the neck to the tail. Toenails are to be dark. Eyes – Brown.
Sable – Color is to be rich sepia brown on the head, ears, feet, legs, back, and tail.  Color is to shade to a lighter brown color on the flanks, underside of the tail, and the belly. Dark face color is to shade off from the eyes to the jaws and blend with the chest and flanks. The darker color on the back is to extend from the head to the tail, with the chest color to match the flank surface color as closely as possible. All blending of color is to be gradual in both dark and paler colors. Toenails are to be dark. Eyes- Brown.
Sable point – Color is to be rich sepia brown on the nose, ears, feet, legs, and tail. Marking color is to shade rapidly to a rich cream body color. The entire body is to be a creamy color, with white undercolor. Some slightly darker shading is permissible on the saddle, but highly undesirable.  Body surface color is to be lighter than the point color to give the proper contrast. Eyes- Brown.
Frosted Pearl – Color is to be a light pearl, carried to the skin, and shaded with a delicate tint of the appropriate shading color. Color is to be evenly distributed over the entire body, except for the belly, which shall be pearl.  Slightly darker tint of the points is permissible. Color is to carry enough tint so as to appear frosty.  Eyes Brown or Blue-grey.
Smoke Pearl – The surface color is to be a rich smoke grey on the head, ears, back, legs, and the top of the tail.  The surface color will fade to a pearl grey on the sides, chest, belly, legs, and on the underside of the tail.  Dark face color is to fade from the eyes to the jaws. All blending of color is to be gradual. The undercolor will be slightly lighter than the surface color. Eyes – Brown or Blue-grey.
Tortoise – Surface color of the body is to be a bright rusty red-orange, blending into a smoky grey-black on the flanks, head, belly, and feet. The surface color is to extend well down the hairshaft to a dark cream undercolor.  Top of the tail is to match the body color but may have a shaded veil. Underside of the tail is to match the shadings. Shading on the head is darkest at the whisker bed, blending into a lighter shade along the jaw line, and darkening again at the ear base. Toe nails to be dark. Eyes - Brown, Blue-grey permissible in Blue and Lilac shadings.

Shaded animals are to show a gradual transition of a basic color, usually from dark to light. Darker color most often appears on the back, head, ears, tail, feet, and leg areas, then shades down to a lighter color on the sides and belly.

Shaded group faults: Fault animals for having streaks, blotches, scattered white hairs, poor color blending, lack of bold shadings. 
Shaded group disqualifications: Disqualify animals for having light toenails when dark toenails are specified in color description.

Pointed White Group:
Black shaded points
Blue shaded points
Chocolate shaded points
Lilac shaded points

The body color is to be white to the skin, except on the points. The colored points are the nose, ears, feet, legs, and the tail. The color of the points is to be as described in the respective self varieties and the color is to be deep and even. The nose marking is to come well up on the face and be well rounded, clean cut, and distinct. The markings are to be carried well up the forelegs and above the hock joint on the hind legs. The ears are to be well colored and clean at the base. Allowances should be made for developing color on juniors. The upper and lower sides of the tail are to be well colored. Toenails are to be colored. Eyes – Red.
Pointed White group faults: Fault animals for having light, faded, or uneven color on the points. Scattered white hairs in the markings. Pointed White group disqualifications: Disqualify animals for having absence of any marking, or white spot in colored section.

BROKEN CLASS
Broken Group: 
Brokens are to include any recognized breed color in conjunction with white. The body color is to be evenly distributed in a patched, spotted, or blanket pattern. All broken pattern animals must have a nose marking, eye circles, and colored ears.  Front feet should be white; rear feet may be white, colored, or partially colored. Do not cut for mismatched or colored toenails. Do not cut for heavily or lightly marked patterns. 
Broken group faults: Fault animals for having unbalanced markings, scattered white hairs, or any faults specified in the respective solid color description.
Broken group disqualifications: Disqualify animals for having less than 10% body color, lack of any head marking, or any disqualifications specified in the respective solid color description.

Disqualification (general character) – Non-lopped, non-rexed, no curls visible in adult, no arch to body, overly fearful or vicious temperament.

Note the following are absent in this breed: agouti, REW, steel, harlequin, Dutch marking, Vienna blue, and silvering genes. No Max Factor, mane, or angora genes, and no dwarf genes.

See also

List of rabbit breeds
Lop rabbit

References

Rabbit breeds
Rabbit breeds originating in Australia